The 10,000-metre speed skating event was part of the speed skating at the 1956 Winter Olympics programme. It was the last speed skating contest at this Games. The competition was held on naturally frozen ice on the Lake Misurina. It was held on Tuesday, 31 January 1956, from 10a.m. to 3:15p.m. Thirty-two speed skaters from 15 nations competed.

Medalists

Records
These were the standing world and Olympic records (in minutes) prior to the 1956 Winter Olympics.

(*) The record was set on naturally frozen ice.

At first Oleg Goncharenko who skated in the third pair set a new Olympic record with 16:42.3 minutes. In the seventh pair Knut Johannesen bettered the Olympic record with 16:36.9 minutes. Finally Sigvard Ericsson set a new Olympic record with 16:35.9 minutes on the way to win the tenth heat and the gold medal.

Results

See also

 1956 Winter Olympics

References

External links
Official Olympic Report
 

Speed skating at the 1956 Winter Olympics